Andersonville is a census-designated place in Ross County, in the U.S. state of Ohio.

History
Andersonville was originally called Lewisville, and under the latter name was laid out in 1851 by Mahlon Anderson. A post office called Andersonville was established in 1873, and remained in operation until 1901. The community was a port town on the Ohio and Erie Canal.

References

Unincorporated communities in Ross County, Ohio
Unincorporated communities in Ohio
1851 establishments in Ohio